Guido Island is an island lying  northeast of Prioress Island in the Wauwermans Islands, in the Wilhelm Archipelago, Antarctica. It was shown on an Argentine government chart of 1950; the name "Isla Guido Spano" appears on a 1957 chart and is for Carlos Guido Spano (1829–1918), a famous Argentine poet.

See also 
 List of Antarctic and sub-Antarctic islands

References

Islands of the Wilhelm Archipelago